Bathymunida eurybregma is a species of squat lobster in the family Munididae. The name is from the Greek eurys, meaning "broad", and bregma, meaning "front of the head", in reference to its broad rostrum.

References

Squat lobsters
Crustaceans described in 1996